Colin J. Gillespie (born 11 May 1941) is a writer, physicist, lawyer and strategic analyst. He is the author of some 30 scientific research publications in quantum physics, biophysics, neurophysiology and radiation biology. He has also written on social planning, class actions, aboriginal law, environmental management and indigenous constitutions. He has 40 years of experience as a strategic analyst for business and aboriginal clients. He is an avid traveller, having spent time in more than 50 countries in all seven continents.

Life and career
Gillespie was born in Adelaide, South Australia, and raised in Evenley near Brackley in England and in Melbourne, Australia. He graduated from Melbourne Grammar School in 1958. In the next decade Australian artist Leon Schwengler was a strong influence on Gillespie's personal philosophy as well as his interest in science and subsequent scientific career. In 1961 he graduated from Melbourne University with a BSc, majoring in nuclear physics and minoring in mathematics and theory of statistics. He then attended Monash University, graduating in 1967 with a PhD in quantum mechanics.

He went on to do post-doctoral work in biophysics with the National Research Council of Canada (1967–1969), and research in neurophysiology and radiation biology with Atomic Energy of Canada Limited (1970–1975). In 1971 with Gordon Gislason, Gillespie developed a program for sensitively measuring radiation-induced strand breaks in mammalian DNA. He became a consultant to aboriginal tribes on implications of hydro-electric development (1975–1977). He was a consultant in 1978 to the Alberta Cancer Hospitals Board and the Alberta Government Committee on Advanced Medical Technology. While working at the Cross Cancer Institute in Edmonton, Alberta he developed a program for actuarial analysis of cancer survival with Adalei Starreveld and co-wrote with Donald Chapman a text on radiation physics, chemistry and biology in mammalian cells. Most recently he co-authored an editorial on "The Power of Biophysics" in the Red Journal.

Gillespie has been a visiting and invited lecturer at the Physics Department, Adelaide University, Australia; Biochemistry Department, University of Alberta, Edmonton, Canada; Physics Department, Calgary University, Calgary, Canada; Animal Health Division, Commonwealth Scientific and Industrial Research Organisation, Melbourne, Australia; Physics Department, McGill University, Montreal, Canada; Canadian Biochemical & Biophysical Society inaugural lecture, Carleton University, Ottawa, Canada; Neurobiology Division, National Institutes of Health, Bethesda, Maryland, United States; L.H. Gray Laboratories, London, United Kingdom; Institute for Atomic Energy in Agriculture, Wageningen, Netherlands.

In 1978 Gillespie went to law school at the University of Manitoba and graduated in 1980 with a LL.B. He was admitted to the Manitoba Bar Association in 1981 and the Saskatchewan Bar in 1987. He specialised in environmental, aboriginal (and especially indigenous) as well as constitutional law. He also pursued a special interest in Aboriginal child protection at Weechi-it-te-win Family Services. Much of his work as a lawyer was for aboriginal clients, often pro bono. He negotiated or litigated settlement of claims against a hydro-electric utility and the governments of Manitoba and Canada. He was involved in settling a class action against paper companies and governments for mercury poisoning of tribes in Ontario. He was counsel to multi-national corporations on environmental licensing.

He was strategic counsel to a company that was building the world's first commercial spaceport at the site of the former Churchill Rocket Research Range and was involved in negotiating the purchase of surplus SS-25 intercontinental ballistic missiles from STC Complex in Russia.

He learned from tribal elders of the constitutions of two indigenous peoples, Pimicikamak and the Anishinabe Nation in Treaty No. 3, and their respective governments and helped them bring these up to date. He worked on cases in the Supreme Court of Canada, most notably the case on whether the Government of Canada could unilaterally patriate the constitution of Canada from the United Kingdom and the case concerning the validity of laws in Manitoba that were made in English and not French.

Scientific career
Research Fellow, National Research Council of Canada (1967–1969)
Research Officer, Atomic Energy of Canada Limited (1970–1976)
Consultant on implications of hydro-electric development (1975–1977)
Consultant to Alberta Cancer Hospitals Board & Alberta Government Committee on Advanced Medical Technology (1977–1978)
Co-authored an editorial on "The Power of Biophysics" in the International Journal of Radiation Oncology, Biology and Physics

Legal career
Associate, Taylor Brazzell McCaffrey (1981–1982) Partner, Taylor McCaffrey (1983–2007), managing partner (1988–1989), senior counsel (2007–2010)
Adjunct Professor, University of Manitoba, Faculty of Graduate Studies] (2000–2007)

Leading cases
The unilateral patriation case (Man. C.A. and S.C.C.)
The Bilodeau case (s. 27 of the Manitoba Act) (Man. C.A. and S.C.C.)
The Air Canada et al. sales tax case (S.C.C.)
Westco Storage Ltd. v. Inter-City Gas Utilities Ltd. (C.A.; S.C.C. leave denied)
Old St. Boniface Residents Association v. City of Winnipeg (C.A.; S.C.C.)

Past & present memberships

American Association for the Advancement of Science
Biophysical Society
Canadian Institute for Administration of Justice
Canadian Bar Association
Selden Society
Society of Professionals in Dispute Resolution

Past offices
vice-president Canadian Mental Health Association Winnipeg Region
chairperson Strategic Planning Committee, chairperson Housing Appeal Board
member-at-large Manitoba Advisory Committee on Sustainable Development Implementation
director & president Social Planning Council of Winnipeg
director Canadian Council on Children and Youth
campaign chairperson of YM/YWCA International Development Committee

Awards

Commonwealth Scholarship (1959)
Monash Post-Graduate Scholarship (1961–1967)
National Research Council Post-Doctoral Fellowship (1967–1970)
William Rachman Prize for Legal Research & Writing (1979)
University of Manitoba Alumni Association Scholarship (1979)
Cathy Turner Prize in Evidence (1980)
Alf Francis Memorial Prize (1980)
Hon. Mr. Justice Hudson Prize in Jurisprudence (1981)
Law Society of Manitoba Prize (1981)

Publications

1960s

1970s

 "Kinetics of the Single-Strand Repair Mechanism in Mammalian Cells", D.L. Dugle & C.J. Gillespie, in Molecular Mechanisms for Repair of DNA, eds. P.C. Hanawalt & R.B. Setlow, Plenum Press, New York (1975) vol. B, 685.
 "Survival of X-Irradiated Hamster Cells: Analysis in Terms of the Chadwick-Leenhouts Model", C.J. Gillespie, J.D. Chapman, A.P. Reuvers & D.L. Dugle, in Cell Survival after Low Doses of Radiation: Theoretical and Clinical Implications, ed. T. Alper, The Institute of Physics & John Wiley, London (1975), 25.

 "Radioprotectors, Radiosensitizers, and the Shape of the Mammalian Cell Survival Curve", J.D. Chapman, C.J. Gillespie, A.P. Reuvers & D.L. Dugle, in Cell Survival after Low Doses of Radiation: Theoretical and Clinical Implications, ed. T. Alper, The Institute of Physics & John Wiley, London (1975), 135.

 "Radiation Inactivation of Mammalian Cells by Single- and Double-Events", J.D. Chapman, A.P. Reuvers & C.J. Gillespie, Biophysical Journal (1975) 15, 17A.
 "Chemical Radiosensitization Studies with Mammalian Cells Growing in Vitro", J.D. Chapman, D.L. Dugle, A.P. Reuvers, C.J. Gillespie & J. Borsa, in Radiation Research – Biomedical, Chemical and Physical Perspectives, eds. O.F. Nygaard, H.I. Adler & W.K. Sinclair Academic Press, New York, (1975) 752.

1980s

1990s

2000s

2010s

 "This Changes Everything" (2012), Winnipeg: Big Fizz Inc.
 "Time One: Discover How the Universe Began" (2013), Winnipeg: Big Fizz Inc.
Colin Gillespie, "Before the Big Bang", Winnipeg Free Press, 24 January 2015, p. D4; http://www.winnipegfreepress.com/arts-and-life/life/sci_tech/before-the-big-bang-289664731.html
Colin Gillespie, "The Supersymmetry Calamity", Winnipeg Free Press, 31 January 2015, p. D4; http://www.winnipegfreepress.com/arts-and-life/life/sci_tech/the-supersymmetry-calamity-290413241.html
Colin Gillespie, "Physics and the Common Cold", Winnipeg Free Press, 7 March 2015, p. D4; http://www.winnipegfreepress.com/arts-and-life/life/sci_tech/physics-and-the-common-cold-295461431.html
Colin Gillespie, "The Vax and Nothing but the Facts", Winnipeg Free Press, 18 April 2015, p. D4 http://www.winnipegfreepress.com/arts-and-life/life/health/the-vax-and-nothing-but-the-facts-300441161.html

References

External links

1941 births
Living people
Australian physicists
Australian non-fiction writers
Scientists from Adelaide
Lawyers in Manitoba
Canadian non-fiction writers
Robson Hall alumni
University of Melbourne alumni
Monash University alumni
People from Evenley
Lawyers in Saskatchewan